Mira Aggarwal (born 15 May 1961) is an Indian politician of the Bharatiya Janata Party (BJP). She is the first Mayor of newly constituted North Delhi Municipal Corporation. She was the first lady to be appointed at the post of Deputy Mayor of Delhi (MCD) in 1998. She is a third time councillor holds an LLB degree and has been elected from Sawan Park ward.

Early life
Mira Aggarwal was born in Delhi, India in a Hindu family. Her father, Lt. Shri. Lala Ram Bilas Gupta, was a freedom fighter, a prominent member of the Rashtriya Swayamsevak Sangh (RSS) since its inception and a well known social worker of Delhi. She completed her early schooling from Govt. Girls Higher Secondary School, Model Town, and then enrolled at Hindu College of University of Delhi. She graduated in Law from Campus Law Centre, University of Delhi. She was an Advocate before High Court of Delhi. Mira Aggarwal began her political career with Akhil Bharatiya Vidyarthi Parishad(ABVP) during her college days. As a student she was very active in public speaking and other social activities.

List of key posts and responsibilities held
 2013 – Vice President, BJP Delhi State
 2012 – present – Member of House (Councillor) from Sawan Park (Ward No. 66), North Delhi Municipal Corporation (NDMC)
 2012 – 2013 – Mayor, North Delhi Municipal Corporation (NDMC)
 2007 – 2012 – Member of House (Councillor) from Kohat Enclave (Ward No. 63), Municipal Corporation of Delhi (MCD)
 2007 – 2010 – Member Standing Committee, Municipal Corporation of Delhi (MCD)
 2010 – 2012 – Chairperson, Appointment, Promotion and Disciplinary Action Committee, Municipal Corporation of Delhi (MCD)
 1999 – Chairperson, Education Committee, Municipal Corporation of Delhi (MCD)
 1998 – Member Parliamentary Board, BJP Delhi State
 1998 – Deputy Mayor of Delhi, Municipal Corporation of Delhi (MCD)
 1997 – 2002 – Member of House (Councillor) from Model Town, Municipal Corporation of Delhi (MCD)
 1995 – 1997 – Member Disciplinary Committee, BJP Delhi
 1995 – Vice President, Mahilla Morcha, BJP Delhi
 1993 – General Secretary, Mahilla Morcha, BJP Delhi
 1993 – 2008 – Executive Member, BJP Delhi
 1983 – 1984 – Joint Secretary, Delhi University Students Union (DUSU) from Akhil Bhartiya Vidyarthee Parishad (ABVP)
 1978 – 1983 – State executive member, State Joint Secretary, State Girls Incharge, Akhil Bhartiya Vidyarthee Parishad (ABVP)
 1978 – Rashtriya Sevika Samiti (15 Day Camp), and started RSS shakha of girls in Model Town

References

1961 births
Living people
Mayors of North Delhi
Bharatiya Janata Party politicians from Delhi
Women mayors of places in Delhi
Hindu College, Delhi alumni
21st-century Indian women politicians
21st-century Indian politicians
20th-century Indian women politicians
20th-century Indian politicians
20th-century Indian lawyers
20th-century Indian women lawyers
21st-century Indian lawyers
21st-century Indian women lawyers